The Donegal High School is a public high school located in Mount Joy, Pennsylvania.  This school is the sole high school in the Donegal School District.  Attendance at this school was reported to be 854.

History 
In 1954, the Donegal High School was formed by the combination of the East Donegal Township, Mount Joy, Marietta, and Mount Joy Township high schools.  The building was built in 1954 at the intersections of PA-772 and Union School Road.  This structure remained as the high school until 2012, when a new building was built on nearby Koser Road.  The former building remains in use as the Donegal Junior High School.

Notable alumni

Chris Heisey, former MLB outfielder
David Hickernell, State representative
 Clarence Charles Newcomer (1923–2005), US District Judge of the United States District Court for the Eastern District of Pennsylvania 
Bruce Sutter, MLB Hall of Fame pitcher

References

Public high schools in Pennsylvania
Schools in Lancaster County, Pennsylvania
1954 establishments in Pennsylvania
Educational institutions established in 1954